Peter Kingsley may refer to:
 Peter Kingsley (24 character), fictional terrorist in the television series 24
 Peter Kingsley (scholar) (born 1953), British classical scholar